is a Japanese athlete who specialises in the pole vault. He competed in the pole vault event at the 2015 World Championships in Athletics in Beijing, China. He finished 21st in the pole vault event at the 2016 Summer Olympics in Rio de Janeiro, Brazil.

International competition

National titles
Japanese Championships
Pole vault: 2015

References

External links
 
 
 
 
 Hiroki Ogita at Mizuno Track Club 

1987 births
Living people
Sportspeople from Kagawa Prefecture
Japanese male pole vaulters
Olympic male pole vaulters
Olympic athletes of Japan
Athletes (track and field) at the 2016 Summer Olympics
World Athletics Championships athletes for Japan
Competitors at the 2009 Summer Universiade
Japan Championships in Athletics winners
20th-century Japanese people
21st-century Japanese people